Philo High School is a public high school in Duncan Falls, Ohio that serves grades 9-12. It is the only high school in the Franklin Local School District. The school colors, as well as the district colors, are gold and blue. They are nicknamed the "Philo Electrics" which they adopted in 1931 after the nearby, former Philo Power Plant. The current principal is Troy Dawson.

References

External links
 District Website
 School Newspaper

High schools in Muskingum County, Ohio
Public high schools in Ohio